Emmanuel Inemo Appah (born 5 November 1999) is a Nigerian weightlifter. He represented Nigeria at the 2019 African Games held in Rabat, Morocco and he won the gold medal in the men's 61kg event. He won the silver medal in his event at the 2021 African Weightlifting Championships held in Nairobi, Kenya.

He competed in the men's 61 kg event at the 2022 Commonwealth Games held in Birmingham, England.

References

External links 
 

Living people
1999 births
Place of birth missing (living people)
Nigerian male weightlifters
African Games medalists in weightlifting
African Games gold medalists for Nigeria
Competitors at the 2019 African Games
African Weightlifting Championships medalists
Weightlifters at the 2022 Commonwealth Games
Commonwealth Games competitors for Nigeria
20th-century Nigerian people
21st-century Nigerian people